The Motorola Backflip (also called the Motorola Motus in some regions) is a touchscreen smartphone released to the U.S. for AT&T on March 7, 2010, and for other countries on Telus and Optus. It runs the open source Google Android software.

General features
The phone is built on the Android platform 1.5. Motorola features Motoblur, which integrates multiple social network service sites on the homescreen. This cannot be uninstalled or disabled unless the phone is modified.
It has a full QWERTY keypad with a "reverse flip" design. When the device is closed and the screen is visible to the user, the reverse side is the keypad itself. Opening the device causes the screen to flip so that it rests above the keypad.

Specifications
The specifications according to the Motorola website in June 2010:

Hardware
Model MB300
Screen size: 3.1-in.
Screen resolution: HVGA (320 × 480 pixels)
Weight: 4.7 oz
Size: 53.0 × 108.0 × 15.3 mm
Input devices: QWERTY keyboard, touchscreen, Backtrack navigation pad behind screen
Battery: 1400 mAh Li Ion 3.7v  Motorola BN80
Talk time: 350 min, 6 hrs
Standby time: up to 315 hrs, 13.5 days
Processor: 528 mHz (overclockable to 768 MHz via root and overclock kernel)
RAM: 256MB
ROM: 512MB
Memory: up to 32 GB MicroSD
Wi-Fi: 802.11b/g
Bluetooth: 2.0 + EDR and A2DP
GPS receiver, accelerometer
Dual microphone with noise cancellation
Five megapixels with 4x digital zoom
LED flash and automatic focus
Video capture rate of 24 fps

Applications
Users may customize their phones by installing apps through the Android Market; however, some carriers (AT&T) do not give users the option to install non-market apps onto the Backflip (a policy they have continued with all of their Android phones). This has created some controversy with users, as the non-market apps are often seen as a useful way to expand a phone's capabilities. Users can circumvent this limitation by manually installing 3rd party apps using the tools included with the SDK while the handset is connected to a computer.

Reviews
Reviews are generally mixed to unfavorable. Michael Oryl, of "Mobileburn.com," likes the "Backtrack" touchpad on the back of the phone, but points out that large hands often activate it accidentally. Victor Godinez, of The Dallas Morning News, suggests that the phone is aimed towards social networkers, and points out that the price is higher than other options with additional features such as the iPhone.

System upgrades
On November 9, 2010, a downloadable update,  Android OS 2.1 (Eclair) and a compatible version of MotoBlur was released by Motorola for AT&T Backflip customers, U.S. only. The update is unavailable over-the-air (OTA).
Since then Eclair is available for phones outside U.S. that are rooted with custom recoveries installed and radio updated. CyanogenMod 7.2 (Android 2.3.7) is available through official releases. Other custom roms are also available.

Overclocking
Overclocking is possible via overclocking kernels and direct overclocking. Overclocking is available up to 768 MHz on the official cyanogenmod 7 rom.

Multitouch
Since this phone lacks the multitouch feature, a patch was made available for the froyo rom. However many testers have reported problems with the touchscreen which becomes jerky and eventually ceases to operate.

Gallery

See also
 Galaxy Nexus
 List of Android devices

References

Motorola smartphones
Android (operating system) devices
Mobile phones introduced in 2010
Discontinued smartphones